Vigna is a genus of plants in the legume family, Fabaceae, with  a pantropical distribution. It includes some well-known cultivated species, including many types of beans. Some are former members of the genus Phaseolus. According to Hortus Third, Vigna differs from Phaseolus in biochemistry and pollen structure, and in details of the style and stipules.

Vigna is also commonly confused with the genus Dolichos, but the two differ in stigma structure.

Vigna are herbs or occasionally subshrubs. The leaves are pinnate, divided into 3 leaflets. The inflorescence is a raceme of yellow, blue, or purple pea flowers. The fruit is a legume pod of varying shape containing seeds.

Familiar food species include the adzuki bean (V. angularis), the black gram (V. mungo), the cowpea (V. unguiculata, including the variety known as the black-eyed pea), and the mung bean (V. radiata). Each of these may be used as a whole bean, a bean paste, or as bean sprouts.

The genus is named after Domenico Vigna, a seventeenth-century Italian botanist and director of the Orto botanico di Pisa.

Uses
Root tubers of Vigna species have traditionally been used as food for Aborigines of the Northern Territory.

Selected species

The genus Vigna contains at least 90 species, including:

Subgenus Ceratotropis
Vigna aconitifolia (Jacq.) Maréchal—moth bean, mat bean, Turkish gram
Vigna angularis (Willd.) Ohwi & H. Ohashi—adzuki bean, red bean
Vigna angularis var. angularis (Willd.) Ohwi & H. Ohashi
Vigna angularis var. nipponensis (Ohwi) Ohwi & H. Ohashi
Vigna glabrescens Maréchal et al.
Vigna grandiflora (Prain) Tateishi & Maxted
Vigna hirtella Ridley
Vigna minima (Roxb.) Ohwi & H. Ohashi
Vigna mungo (L.) Hepper—black gram, black lentil, white lentil, urd-bean, urad bean
Vigna mungo var. silvestris Lukoki, Maréchal & Otoul
Vigna nakashimae (Ohwi) Ohwi & H. Ohashi
Vigna nepalensis Tateishi & Maxted
Vigna radiata (L.) Wilczek—mung bean, green gram, golden gram, mash bean, green soy, celera-bean, Jerusalem-pea
Vigna radiata var. radiata (L.) Wilczek
Vigna radiata var. sublobata (Roxb.) Verdc.
Vigna reflexopilosa Hayata—Creole-bean
Vigna reflexopilosa var. reflexopilosa Hayata
Vigna reflexopilosa var. glabra Tomooka & Maxted
Vigna riukiuensis (Ohwi) Ohwi & H. Ohashi
Vigna stipulacea Kuntze
Vigna subramaniana (Babu ex Raizada) M. Sharma
Vigna tenuicaulis N. Tomooka & Maxted
Vigna trilobata (L.) Verdc.—jungle mat bean, jungli-bean, African gram, three-lobe-leaved cowpea
Vigna trinervia (Heyne ex Wall.) Tateishi & Maxted
Vigna umbellata (Thunb.) Ohwi & H. Ohashi—ricebean, red bean, climbing mountain-bean, mambi bean, Oriental-bean

Subgenus Haydonia
Vigna monophylla Taub.
Vigna nigritia Hook. f.
Vigna schimperi Baker
Vigna triphylla (R. Wilczek) Verdc.

Subgenus Lasiospron
Vigna diffusa (Scott-Elliot) A. Delgado & Verdc.
Vigna juruana (Harms) Verdc.
Vigna lasiocarpa (Mart. ex Benth.) Verdc.
Vigna longifolia (Benth.) Verdc.
Vigna schottii (Bentham) A. Delgado & Verdc.
Vigna trichocarpa (C. Wright ex Sauvalle) A. Delgado
Vigna vexillata (L.) A. Rich.—zombi pea, wild cowpea
Vigna vexillata var. angustifolia
Vigna vexillata var. youngiana

Subgenus Vigna
Vigna ambacensis Welw. ex Bak.
Vigna angivensis Baker
Vigna filicaulis Hepper
Vigna friesiorum Harms
Vigna gazensis Baker f.
Vigna hosei (Craib) Backer—Sarowak/sarawak bean
Vigna luteola (Jacq.) Benth.—Dalrymple vigna
Vigna membranacea A. Rich.
Vigna membranacea subsp. caesia (Chiov.) Verdc.
Vigna membranacea subsp. membranacea A. Rich.
Vigna monantha Thulin
Vigna racemosa (G. Don) Hutch. & Dalziel
Vigna subterranea (L.) Verdc.—Bambara groundnut, Congo goober, hog-peanut, jugo bean, njugumawe (Swahili) (sometimes separated in Voandzeia)
Vigna unguiculata (L.) Walp.—cowpea, crowder pea, Southern pea, Reeve's-pea, snake-bean
Vigna unguiculata subsp. cylindrica—catjang
Vigna unguiculata subsp. dekindtiana—wild cowpea, African cowpea, Ethiopian cowpea
Vigna unguiculata subsp. sesquipedalis—yardlong bean, long-podded cowpea, asparagus bean, Chinese long bean, pea-bean
Vigna unguiculata subsp. unguiculata—black-eyed pea, black-eyed bean

Incertae sedis

Vigna comosa
Vigna dalzelliana
Vigna debilis Fourc.
Vigna decipiens
Vigna dinteri Harms
Vigna dolichoides Baker in Hooker f.

Vigna frutescens

Vigna gracilis

Vigna kirkii
Vigna lanceolata—pencil yam, Maloga-bean, parsnip-bean, merne arlatyeye (Arrernte)

Vigna lobata (Willd.) Endl.
Vigna lobatifolia
Vigna marina (Burm.f.) Merr.—dune-bean, notched cowpea, sea-bean, mohihihi, nanea (Hawaiian)

Vigna multiflora
Vigna nervosa
Vigna oblongifolia
Vigna owahuensis Vogel—Oahu cowpea
Vigna parkeri—creeping vigna

Vigna pilosa

References

External links 

 
Fabaceae genera
Pantropical flora